The Odisha Official Language Act, 1954 is an Act of Odisha Legislative Assembly that recognizes Odia "to be used for all or any of the official purposes of the State of Odisha."

History 
Article 345 of the Constitution of India empowers the Legislature of the State to adopt 'any one or more of the languages in use in the State or Hindi as the language or languages to be used for all or any of the official purposes' of the concerned State. But it provides for the continued use of English for the 'purposes within the state for which it was being used before the commencement of the Constitution', until the Legislature of the State otherwise provides by law. Orissa is the first state to be evolved on the basis of language. So The Orissa Official Language Act, 1954 was enacted in 1954.

Development 
Despite the enactment, the implementation has not been done in a mass scale for which people of Odisha have voiced to ensure the use of Odia language in all official correspondence. The hunger strike by activist Gajanana Mishra was a prominent step in this direction was one such significant instance.

Salient features 
The Orissa Official Language Act, 1954 is the Orissa Act 14 of 1954 which received the assent of Governor on 1 October 1954 and was published in the Orissa Gazette on 15 October 1954.

Important Sections

Section 3A 
This section has been inserted by the Amendment Act 1963 which states about Continuance of English language for use in Legislature:

Amendments 
 The 1963 Orissa Official Language (Amendment) Bill makes provision for continuing use of English in addition to Odia for transaction of business in legislature of the state of Orissa.
 One new amendment was added to this act under Amendment Act 12 of 1985.

References

Odisha state legislation
1954 in law